Larry Donell Harris, Jr. (1985 – July 1, 2010) was a United States Marine who posthumously received the Silver Star for his actions as Fire Team Leader with 81mm Mortar Platoon, Weapons Company, 3rd Battalion, 1st Marines during a firefight in Helmand Province, Afghanistan on July 1, 2010. Corporal Harris was buried in Fort Logan National Cemetery in Denver, Colorado.

Legacy 
On May 19, 2016, at a ceremony onboard Marine Corps Base Camp Pendleton, a Crucible obstacle related to improvised explosive devices was renamed "Harris Trail", in honor of Corporal Harris.

See also
Larry Trail Dedication Ceremony

References

External links 

1985 births
2010 deaths
American military personnel killed in the War in Afghanistan (2001–2021)
Recipients of the Silver Star
United States Marine Corps personnel of the Iraq War
United States Marine Corps personnel of the War in Afghanistan (2001–2021)
United States Marines